Established in 1931, the Minister of Justice of the Government of Catalonia is the highest representative of the Department of Justice.

The Center for Legal Studies and Specialized Training and the Center for Contemporary History remain attached to the department.

Functions 
The functions of the Department of Justice correspond to:

 The functions related to the Justice Administration in Catalonia and its modernization.
 Penitentiary services, rehabilitation and juvenile justice.
 The conservation, updating and development of civil law in Catalonia.
 Associations, foundations, professional colleges and academies.
 Notaries and registrars.
 The promotion and development of alternative means of conflict resolution.
 Religious affairs
 The democratic memory, the promotion of peace and political and civil human rights.
 The regulation and supervision of interest groups.
 Any other attributed to you by law and other provisions.

List of ministers

See also

 Department of Justice of the Generalitat de Catalunya
Justice ministry
The Ministry of Justice of Spain
Politics of Catalonia
The Public Prosecutor of the Autonomous Communities of Spain
Spanish Attorney General

References

External links
 

 
Justice
Justice ministries